Juhan "Jaan" Kikkas (5 June 1892 – 9 March 1944) was an Estonian middleweight weightlifter. He won a bronze medal at the 1924 Summer Olympics, setting a world record in the snatch.

Kikkas first trained as a cyclist, and changed to weightlifting in 1921, aged 29. Next year he placed fourth at the world championships. In 1925 he won his only national weightlifting title. After retiring from competitions he ran his metal workshop in Tallinn. He died there in 1944 during a Soviet air raid.

References

External links

Profile  with picture
The Soviet terror air raid to Tallinn  on March 9/10, 1944
Juhan Kikas at The March  Raid Dedication List

1892 births
1944 deaths
Sportspeople from Valga, Estonia
People from the Governorate of Livonia
Estonian male weightlifters
Olympic bronze medalists for Estonia
Olympic weightlifters of Estonia
Weightlifters at the 1924 Summer Olympics
Olympic medalists in weightlifting
Medalists at the 1924 Summer Olympics
Civilians killed in World War II
Deaths by airstrike during World War II